Geoffrey Askeby was the member of Parliament for Great Grimsby in 1378, October 1383, and September 1388; and mayor of that town.

References 

Year of birth missing
Year of death missing
Mayors of Grimsby
English MPs 1378
English MPs October 1383
English MPs September 1388
Members of the Parliament of England for Great Grimsby